Christian Lyte (born 1 March 1989, Manchester) is a Barbadon, English born competitive cyclist, specialising in track sprinting. He is a former member of the British Cycling Olympic Academy.  He is a junior world team sprint champion for the second year running and junior keirin world champion for 2007.

Palmarès

2005
1st  sprint, British National Track Championships (U16)
2nd  500m TT, British National Track Championships (U16)

2006
1st team sprint, UCI World Track Championships, junior (with Jason Kenny & David Daniell)
1st  team sprint, British National Track Championships (Junior)
2nd  kilo, British National Track Championships (Junior)
3rd  sprint, British National Track Championships (Junior)
3rd  keirin, British National Track Championships (Junior)
3rd  sprint, British National Track Championships (Junior)
3rd  3km pursuit, British National Track Championships (Junior)

2007
1st team sprint, UCI World Track Championships, Mexico, Junior
1st keirin, UCI World Track Championships, Mexico, Junior
1st  sprint, Junior European Track Championships
1st  keirin, British National Track Championships (Junior)
1st  scratch, British National Track Championships (Junior)
2nd sprint, UCI World Track Championships, Mexico, Junior
2nd  keirin, Junior European Track Championships
2nd  team sprint, Junior European Track Championships
2nd  kilo, British National Track Championships (Junior)
3rd  team sprint, U23 European Track Championships
3rd  sprint, British National Track Championships (Junior)

2009
3rd  keirin, British National Track Championships (Senior)

See also
Lyte (surname)

References

http://www.britishcycling.org.uk/search?s=christian+lyte&type=article

English track cyclists
English male cyclists
Sportspeople from Manchester
1989 births
Living people